Adixoana is a genus of moths in the  family Urodidae containing only one species, Adixoana auripyga, which is known from Equatorial Guinea. The species was formerly included in the family Sesiidae.

References

Monotypic moth genera
Moths of Africa
Urodidae